Master–slave morality is a central theme of Friedrich Nietzsche's works, particularly in the first essay of his book On the Genealogy of Morality. Nietzsche argues that there are two fundamental types of morality: "master morality" and "slave morality". Master morality values pride, wealth, fame and power, while slave morality values kindness, empathy, and sympathy. Master morality judges actions as good or bad (e.g. the classical virtues of the noble man versus the vices of the rabble), unlike slave morality, which judges by a scale of good or evil intentions (e. g. Christian virtues and vices, Kantian deontology).

For Nietzsche, a morality is inseparable from the culture that values it, meaning that each culture's language, codes, practices, narratives, and institutions are informed by the struggle between these two moral structures.

Master morality
Nietzsche defined master morality as the morality of the strong-willed. He criticizes the view (which he identifies with contemporary British ideology) that good is everything that is helpful, and bad is everything that is harmful. He argues proponents of this view have forgotten its origins and that it is based merely on habit: what is useful has always been defined as good, therefore usefulness is goodness as a value. He writes that in the prehistoric state "the value or non-value of an action was derived from its consequences" but that ultimately "[t]here are no moral phenomena at all, only moral interpretations of phenomena." For strong-willed men, the "good" is the noble, strong, and powerful, while the "bad" is the weak, cowardly, timid, and petty. 	

The essence of master morality is nobility. Other qualities that are often valued in master morality are open-mindedness, courage, truthfulness, trustworthiness, and an accurate sense of one's self-worth. Master morality begins in the "noble man", with a spontaneous idea of the good; then the idea of bad develops as what is not good. "The noble type of man experiences itself as determining values; it does not need approval; it judges, "what is harmful to me is harmful in itself"; it knows itself to be that which first accords honour to things; it is value-creating." In master morality, people define the good based on whether it benefits them and their pursuit of self-defined personal excellence. Insofar as something is helpful to the strong-willed man, it is like what he values in himself; therefore, the strong-willed man values such things as good because they aid him in a life-long process of self-actualization through the will to power.

Slave morality

According to Nietzsche, masters create morality; slaves respond to master morality with their slave morality. Unlike master morality, which is sentiment, slave morality is based on re-sentiment—devaluing what the master values and the slave does not have. As master morality originates in the strong, slave morality originates in the weak. Because slave morality is a reaction to oppression, it vilifies its oppressors. Slave morality is the inverse of master morality. As such, it is characterized by pessimism and cynicism. Slave morality is created in opposition to what master morality values as good. 

Slave morality does not aim at exerting one's will by strength, but by careful subversion. It does not seek to transcend the masters, but to make them slaves as well. The essence of slave morality is utility: The good is what is most useful for the whole community, not just the strong. Nietzsche sees this as a contradiction. Since the powerful are few compared to the masses of the weak, the weak gain power by corrupting the strong into believing that the causes of slavery (viz., the will to power) are evil, as are the qualities the weak originally could not choose because of their weakness. By saying humility is voluntary, slave morality avoids admitting that their humility was in the beginning forced upon them by a master. Biblical principles of humility, charity, and pity are the result of universalizing the plight of the slave onto all humankind, and thus enslaving the masters as well. "The democratic movement is the heir to Christianity"—the political manifestation of slave morality because of its obsession with freedom and equality.

Society

According to Nietzsche, the struggle between master and slave moralities recurs historically. He noted that ancient Greek and Roman societies were grounded in master morality. The Homeric hero is the strong-willed man, and the classical roots of the Iliad and Odyssey exemplified Nietzsche's master morality. He calls the heroes "men of a noble culture", giving a substantive example of master morality. Historically, master morality was defeated, as Christianity's slave morality spread throughout the Roman Empire. 

After the destruction of the Second Temple in Jerusalem in 70 AD, Judea completely lost its independence to Rome, and after the defeat of the Bar-Kokhba revolt in 136 AD it ceased to exist as a national state of Jewish people. The struggle between the polytheistic culture of Rome (master, strong) and newly developed Christian monotheism in former Judea and surrounding territories in the Middle East (slave, weak) lasted continuously until 323, when Christianity became the Roman Empire's official religion. Nietzsche condemns the triumph of slave morality in the West, saying that the democratic movement is the "collective degeneration of man". He claims that the nascent democratic movement of his time was essentially slavish and weak. Weakness conquered strength, slave conquered master, re-sentiment conquered sentiment. This ressentiment Nietzsche calls "priestly vindictiveness", based on the jealous weak seeking to enslave the strong and thus erode the basis for power by pulling the powerful down. Such movements were, according to Nietzsche, inspired by "the most intelligent revenge" of the weak. Nietzsche saw democracy and Christianity as the same emasculating impulse, which sought to make everyone equal by making everyone a slave.

Nietzsche did not necessarily believe that everyone should adopt master morality as the "be-all, end-all" behavior. He thought that the revaluation of morals would correct the inconsistencies in both master and slave moralities. But he asserted that for the individual, master morality was preferable to slave morality.

See also
Critique of work
Master–slave dialectic
Orthodoxy
The Marriage of Heaven and Hell

References

Sources

 
 
 

Philosophy of Friedrich Nietzsche
Conceptual distinctions
Morality
Exegesis